The Amargosa springsnail (Pyrgulopsis amargosae) is a snail in the family Hydrobiidae.  It is endemic to the Amargosa River drainage of the southwestern United States. The small (1.5–2.7 mm high) snail is known to occur in several near-brackish springs, including the type locality of Saratoga Springs in Death Valley.

References

Pyrgulopsis
Molluscs of the United States
Endemic fauna of California
Freshwater animals of North America
Death Valley
Gastropods described in 1989